Sarah Adina Smith is an American film writer, director, and editor. Films she has directed include Buster's Mal Heart (2016), and The Midnight Swim (2014). She also directed two episodes from the television series Room 104. Her films often center around  mysticism, spirituality and psychology, and the surreal.

Early life and education
Smith was born in Fort Collins, Colorado. She graduated from Poudre High School in 2001, and studied philosophy at Columbia University in New York.

Career
Smith's first feature as director, The Midnight Swim, was released in 2014. The film was noted for its shifts in visual style, and won six awards on the festival circuit, including the audience award from AFI Fest.

Her sophomore feature, Buster's Mal Heart, premiered at the 2014 Toronto International Film Festival, and stars Rami Malek, DJ Qualls, and Kate Lyn Sheil.

Smith co-wrote the screenplay for the film Unlovable, which screened at the SXSW festival in 2018.

In 2018 Smith was chosen to direct the first two episodes of television adaptation of the film Hanna. In 2019, she directed one episode of the television adaptation of the novel Looking for Alaska.

She wrote and directed the 2021 film Birds of Paradise and the 2022 film The Drop.

Filmography

Short films

Feature films

Television

References

External links

Living people
21st-century American screenwriters
21st-century American women writers
American television directors
American women film directors
American women screenwriters
American women television directors
Columbia University alumni
Film directors from Colorado
People from Fort Collins, Colorado
Screenwriters from Colorado
Year of birth missing (living people)